The 1984–85 NBA season was Indiana's ninth season in the NBA and 18th season as a franchise.

Offseason

Draft picks

This table only lists picks through the second round.

Roster

Regular season

Season standings

z - clinched division title
y - clinched division title
x - clinched playoff spot

Record vs. opponents

Game log

Player statistics

Season

Player Statistics Citation:

Awards and records

Transactions

References

See also
 1984-85 NBA season

Indiana Pacers seasons
Ind
Indiana
Indiana